Tan Xiaolin (April 25, 1911 – August 1, 1948) was a Chinese composer.

He was born in Shanghai to parents from Kaiping, Guangdong. He composed works for Chinese instruments and several songs while studying music theory and the pipa at the Shanghai Conservatory. In 1939, he moved to the United States, where he did further studies with Paul Hindemith at Yale and the Oberlin College. He had won a John Day Jackson scholarship with his string trio (1945). He returned to Shanghai in 1946 to teach at the Conservatory. His pupils include Qu Xixian, Chen Peixun and Sang Tong. In 1948, he died in a hospital in Shanghai when he was only 37 years old.

Most of Tan's works in the Western classical music style are art songs and chamber works. His later pieces show the influence of Hindemith and his interest in aspects of neoclassicism. Some of his songs are published in Tan Xiaolin gequ xuanji (A selection of songs by Tan) (Beijing, 1982). Tan is regarded as one of the pioneers of the modern art music of China.

References 

Chinese male composers
Chinese classical composers
1911 births
1948 deaths
Republic of China musicians
Musicians from Shanghai
20th-century classical composers
Pupils of Paul Hindemith
20th-century male musicians